This is a list of members of the South Australian Legislative Council from 1851 to 1855. Sixteen members were elected at the 1851 election with terms expiring in 1854. The four official (i.e. holding offices – front bench) members and four non-official members were nominated by the Governor on behalf of the Crown. Voting was voluntary and restricted to land-holding males. 
The first meeting was held on 28 August 1851 at the newly completed courthouse on Victoria Square.
This council was dissolved by proclamation on 15 August 1855, and elections held for six city seats on 20 September and seven country seats on 21 September.

References

Members of South Australian parliaments by term
19th-century Australian politicians